The East Moline Correctional Center  is a minimum-security state prison for men located in East Moline, Rock Island County, Illinois, owned and operated by the Illinois Department of Corrections.  The facility was opened in 1980 and has a capacity of 1452 inmates, which includes the associated East Moline Work Camp.

References

Prisons in Illinois
Buildings and structures in Rock Island County, Illinois
1980 establishments in Illinois